Niththiyanantham Indirakumar (alias Prasanna) is a Sri Lankan Tamil politician and provincial councillor.

Indirakumar is the Deputy Leader and General Secretary of the Tamil Eelam Liberation Organization.

Indirakumar contested the 2010 parliamentary election as one of the Tamil National Alliance's candidates in Batticaloa District but failed to get elected after coming fifth amongst the TNA candidates. He contested the 2012 provincial council election as one of the TNA's candidates in Batticaloa District and was elected to the Eastern Provincial Council (EPC). A few days after the election some TNA councillors including Indirakumar were threatened and coerced into joining the United People's Freedom Alliance but none of them gave into the threats. Indirakumar and the other newly elected TNA provincial councillors took their oaths on 28 September 2012 in front of TNA leader and Member of Parliament R. Sampanthan.

References

Living people
Members of the Eastern Provincial Council
People from Eastern Province, Sri Lanka
Sri Lankan Tamil politicians
Tamil Eelam Liberation Organization politicians
Tamil National Alliance politicians
Year of birth missing (living people)